U Line is a rapid transit line in Seoul, South Korea.

U Line or Uline may also refer to:

 Uline, an American industrial supply company
 Transilien Line U, a line of the Paris transport network
 U (Los Angeles Railway), a former streetcar line